Shanghai Zoological Park, or commonly Shanghai Zoo in short, is the main zoological garden in Shanghai. It is located near the township of Hongqiao (formerly Hung-Jao) and is administratively in Changning District. Shanghai Zoo was formerly known as " Xijiao Park" (or "Western Suburbs Park"), which is still a common name used locally for the zoo.

History
The site of what is presently the Shanghai Zoo was first developed as livery stables in 1890. In 1914, the livery stables were purchased by a consortium of merchants, and in 1916 it was converted into the Hung-Jao Golf Club, one of Shanghai's largest golf clubs. Like many other foreign-owned clubs, its property was in 1953 resumed by the new government, after the Chinese Communist Party took over Shanghai in 1949. In 1954, the former golf course was opened to the public 1954 as "Xijiao Park". In 1959, a series of animal enclosures were built and the park was expanded. In 1980, the park was renamed "Shanghai Zoological Park".

Current zoo

After half a century of development, the Shanghai Zoo has become one of the best ecological gardens in Shanghai. The zoo houses and exhibits more than 6,000 animals, among which are 600 Chinese animals that include giant pandas, golden snub-nosed monkeys, lions, South China tigers, hoopoe, black bulbuls, great hornbills and Bactrian camels. Animals from other parts of the world include chimpanzees, giraffes, zebras, kangaroos, gorillas, ring tailed lemurs, common marmosets, spider monkeys, scimitar-horned oryx, african wild dogs, olive baboons, mandrills, Canadian lynxes and maned wolves. The zoo is constantly developing and improving the animal enclosures in order to provide better environments for the animals and a pleasurable experience for visitors.

The original golf course design has been basically preserved. There are a total of 100,000 trees with nearly 600 species planted in the zoo. The green areas and lawns cover an area of 100,000 square meters. The zoo endeavours to create an ecologically friendly environment for the animals - the 'Swan Lake' with its natural reed clumps and trees providing shade for pelicans, geese, black swans, night herons and other birds, is a perfect example of this.

The Shanghai Zoo provides areas for amusement and leisure, opportunities for visitors to increase their knowledge of the various animals and combines this with scientific and technical research to help people better understand and protect animals. Since the zoo was established it has been host to over 150,000,000 visitors.

The aim of the Shanghai Zoo is to have visitors leave with a better understanding of and appreciation for the animals and their environment.

Animals with an asterisk ("*") might have been moved.

Swan Lake
Dalmatian pelican
Great white pelican
Black swan
Mute swan
Bewick's swan
Whooper swan
Swan goose
Mallard
Common shelduck
Green-winged teal
Mandarin duck
Bar-headed goose
Greater white-fronted goose
Bean goose
Eurasian wigeon
Ruddy shelduck
Mandarin duck

Aviary
Orange-headed thrush
Hoopoe
White wagtail
Drongos
Oriental greenfinches
Black-collared starling

Outdoor Bird Garden
Ostrich
Cassowary
Indian peafowl
Rhea
Emu
Golden pheasant
Silver pheasant
Common pheasant

Pheasant Corridor
Temminck's tragopans
Swinhoe's pheasant
Lady Amherst's pheasant
Brown eared pheasant
White eared pheasant
Great bustard
Elliot's pheasant

Big Cat Enclosures
Bengal tiger
Jaguar
Black panther

Outdoor Carnivore Islands
Siberian tiger
Lion
South China tiger

Carnivore Boardwalk
Sun bear
Dhole
Canadian lynx
Red fox
Cheetah
Maned wolf
Wolf
African wild dog
Leopard
Cougars*

Panda House and Bear Pits
Moon bear
Brown bear
Red panda
Giant panda

Polar Bear World
Polar bear*

Herbivore Paddocks
Yak
Blue sheep
American bison*
Blackbuck*
Red deer
Sika deer
Himalayan tahr
Ibex
Llama
Common eland
Mongolian wild ass
Sambar
Scimitar-horned oryx
wild horse
Bactrian camel
Golden takin
Black muntjac
Reeve's muntjac
Red goral
Hog deer
Blesbuck
Giraffe
Addax*
Zebra
Asian elephant
Lowland anoa*

Kangaroo Lawn
Eastern grey kangaroo
Red kangaroo*
Swamp wallaby*
Red-necked wallaby

Aquatic Mammals Boardwalk
Spotted seal
California sea lion
Fur seals
Hippo
South American tapir
White fallow deer
Ostrich
White rhino
Emu

Raptor Area
Golden eagle
Monk vulture
Griffon vulture
Black-eared kite
Shikra
Oriental honey-buzzard
Common kestrel
American kestrel

Flamingo Pond
Greater flamingo
Lesser flamingo*

Waterbird Houses
Painted stork*
Yellow-billed stork*
Brown booby*
White-breasted waterhen
Slaty-backed gull
Black-headed gull
Herring gull
Great cormorant
Scaly-sided merganser
Grey heron

Parrot House
Cockatiels
Amazon parrots
Sulphur-crested cockatoos
Green-winged macaws
Scarlet macaws
Blue-and-gold macaws
Umbrella cockatoos
Eclectus parrots
Peach-faced lovebirds
Salmon-crested cockatoo
Long-billed corella
Moustached parakeet

Hornbill and Toucan Circle
Wreathed hornbill
Great hornbill
Toco toucan
Red-billed toucan
Western crowned pigeon
Oriental pied hornbills

Wader Stream
Common crane
Oriental stork
Black crowned crane
Red-crowned crane
Little egret
Black-crowned night heron
White-naped crane
Chinese pond heron
Demoiselle crane

Indoor Bird House
Black-naped oriole
Diamond dove
Red-billed blue magpie
Black-billed magpie
Java finch
Plumbeous water redstart
Common myna
Oriental dollarbird
Bulbuls
Domestic canary
Black-capped kingfisher
Laughing kookaburra

Penguin Pool
African penguin

Bailing Pet World and Small Animal Area
Dog
cat
Binturong*
Masked palm civet
Hog badger
Arctic foxes
Wild boar
Cape porcupine
Eurasian otter
Coypu
Raccoon-dog
Banded mongoose
Raccoon
Striped skunk*

Monkey Houses
White-headed langur
Golden snub-nosed monkey
Stump-tailed macaque
François' langur
Olive baboon
Hamadryas baboon
Patas monkey
De Brazza's monkey*
Ring-tailed lemur
Weeper capuchin*
Common squirrel monkey
Hoolock gibbons
Ring-tailed lemur
Spider monkey
Vervet monkey*
Crab-eating macaque
Mandrill
Black howler*
L'Hoest's monkey*
Black-and-white colobus monkeys*
Lion-tailed macaque*
Black-and-white ruffed lemur*

Nocturnal Animal and Tamarin House
Cotton-topped tamarin
Common marmoset
Leschenault's rousette
Slow loris
Slender loris
Sugar glider
Leadbeater's possum
Golden-headed lion tamarin

Ape Islands and Gorilla Pavilion
Gorilla
Chimpanzee
Orangutan

Indoor Reptile House
Asian water monitor
Green iguana
King cobra
Leatherback turtle
Indian cobra
Indian python
Albino Indian python
Japanese giant salamander
Bearded dragon
Radiated tortoise
Chinese softshell turtle
Aldabra giant tortoise
Spectacled caiman
Chinese stripe-necked turtle
Chinese pond turtle
Red-eared slider

Walk-in Reptile House
Chinese alligator
Snapping turtle
Painted batagur

Fresh-and Saltwater Aquarium
Whitefin sharksucker
Spadefish
Moorish idol
Pennant coralfish
Threadfin butterflyfish
Pufferfishes
Chinese sturgeon
Bighead carp
Common carp
Freshwater angelfish
Neon tetras
Blood parrot cichlid
Giant gourami
Surgeonfish

Goldfish Hall and Koi Pond
Comet goldfish
Black moor
Koi
Lionhead
Pompom
Common goldfish
Bubble eye
Veiltail
Shubunkin
Pearlscale
Fantail
Oranda
Ryukin
Ranchu
Celestial eye
Lionchu

Children's Zoo
British Saddleback (pig)
Sheep
Goat

Gallery

References

External links

 (in Chinese)
Old Shanghai Zoo Website (Archived 2004)
Shanghai Zoo on zooinstitutes.com

Buildings and structures in Shanghai
Tourist attractions in Shanghai
Zoos in China
Changning District